Richard Magnus Franz Morris (15 June 1934 in Liberia – 27 June 2012)  was a Liberian business and civic leader.

Life and family 
Richard Magnus Franz Morris was born in Farmerville, Sinoe County, on June 15, 1934. His parents were descendants of Americo-Liberian families that settled in Sinoe County, Liberia. His father was Jacob Franz Morris, a Liberian who settled in Greenville, Sinoe County, and later became the First Gee-Claw Commandant (an Americo-Liberian group in Sinoe County). His mother was Mary Emma Morris (a granddaughter of the late and former Vice President of Liberia Joseph J. Ross, a niece of the former Vice President of Liberia Samuel Alfred Ross). Mary Emma Morris' father's family had settled in Farmerville, Sinoe County. Richard grew up in Greenville along with his siblings. Richard completed his early education in Greenville, Sinoe County, and traveled to Monrovia to complete his high school education at the Lab High School (now known as William V.S Tubman High School).

Education
Morris received his bachelor of science degree in mathematics from the University of Liberia in 1956 (His attendance was from 1952-1956). He left for Mainz, Germany, immediately following graduation on a scholarship to attend Johannes Gutenbeg University of Mainz. He obtained a graduate diploma in mathematics (Diplom Vorexamen) in 1963. Morris continued his studies through a Fulbright Scholarship at the Iowa State University, where he obtained a Master of Science in economics, 1967. His thesis was entitled "An Economic and Institutional Analysis of the Nigerian Economy".

Marriage and death
Morris married Lorraine V. Morris in 1964; they had many children. They remained married for 48 years until his death on June 27, 2012.

Career
Morris returned to Liberia, where he worked at the Bureau of National Planning in 1967, and  served as director of research, Ministry of Planning and Economic Affairs from 1967 to 1970. He was elected to the governing council of the United Nations Institute for Economic and Statistical Planning (IDEP), located in Dakar, Senegal.

In addition to his work for the Liberian Government, Morris taught mathematics and economics at the University of Liberia for fifteen years.  He achieved the rank of assistant professor of economics at the University of Liberia.

Morris served the Liberian Government as Principal Deputy Minister of Commerce, Industry and Transportation from 1971 to 1975. Morris became the first director general of National Social Security and Welfare Corporation, 1976 to 1980, but the position was terminated by the coup d'état which occurred on April 12, 1980.

In 1981, Morris left the governmental sector and continued his career as managing director of the Small Enterprise Financing Organization (SEFO). In 1986, he became president of the Small Enterprise Financing Organization.

Morris served as the chairman of the board of directors for the National Social Security and Welfare Corporation in 1989. Beginning in 1992, Morris worked briefly as a consultant in Ghana before emigrating in 1994 to the United States to join his family.

Papers written by Morris
 "Restructuring of the Liberian Economy: 1997";A Reflection of an Export - Oriented Competitiveness as a Strategy for Sustained Economic Growth and Development.
 "An American Trade Strategy/Policy For Africa: 1994";Proposal for the Removal of Institution Gaps in African Economies to Facilitate the Maximization of Trade and Investment with the United States of America.
 "Strategies for Improved Domestic and International Trade and Commerce: 1991";A Development Model to Build the Indigenous Private Sector in Liberia.

References
  at TLC Africa
 Holsoe, Svend E. (2008). "A Bibliography of Liberia: Printed Liberian Government Documents - Executive Branch".
 Annual report. 1976. Richard M. Morris, Director General 50 Pp +Appendices. 
 Annual report. 1979. Richard M. Morris, Director General 56 Pp +Appendices.
 ULAA Re-awakening. Special Issue. Published By the Publicity Committee of ULAA, Monrovia, Liberia Vol. 1 No. 1(August 12, 1983).

University of Liberia alumni
Iowa State University alumni
Johannes Gutenberg University Mainz alumni
People from Sinoe County
1934 births
2012 deaths
Liberian businesspeople
Fulbright alumni